Fabrice Do Marcolino Anguilet (born 14 March 1983 in Libreville) is a Gabonese professional footballer who currently plays as a striker for FC Istres in the Championnat National, the third tier of French football.

In the summer of 2009, he joined Stade Laval after spending three seasons at Angers SCO, despite the fact that the two clubs are rivals.

Do Marcolino has made several appearances for the Gabon national football team.

His brother, Arsène, also plays football professionally.

International career
He represented his country at the 2012 African Cup of Nations, during which Gabon, as hosts of the competition, reached the quarter-finals.

References

External links
 
 
 

1983 births
Living people
Gabonese footballers
Gabon international footballers
2010 Africa Cup of Nations players
Sportspeople from Libreville
Angoulême Charente FC players
Stade Rennais F.C. players
Stade Lavallois players
Amiens SC players
Expatriate footballers in France
Gabonese expatriates in France
Angers SCO players
Vannes OC players
USJA Carquefou players
FC Istres players
Ligue 2 players
Championnat National players
2012 Africa Cup of Nations players
Association football forwards
US Changé players
21st-century Gabonese people